Shemshi (also Romanized as Shemshī; also known as Shemsī) is a village in Surak Rural District, Lirdaf District, Jask County, Hormozgan Province, Iran. At the 2006 census, its population was 669, in 163 families.

References 

Populated places in Jask County